The Boys on the Rock is a novel by John Fox, which follows the coming out and first love of a gay sixteen-year-old swimmer.

Plot
Set in the Bronx against the historical backdrop of United States Senator Eugene McCarthy's unsuccessful bid to become the Democratic presidential candidate for the 1968 elections, the novel focuses on Connors's "rocky relationship that fared no better than McCarthy's campaign", in the words of critic Wayne Hoffman (author of the novel Hard), who described it in The Washington Post as a "classic".

Reception
Kirkus Reviews called it "a slight first novel with an uneasy blend of graphic sex, a faux-naif Y A tone, and gay-pride preachiness." and found it "Occasionally sharp in its place/time specifics, but otherwise a juvenile debut–both punkily narcissistic and sloppily sentimental." while Trevor Sydney said that "Fox's only novel remains a compelling Bildungsroman."

International influence
The Boys on the Rock has been described as "A watershed in the history of the translation of queer literature into Japanese...". Its translation "was subsequently followed by a large number of translations of novels about queer desire - more specifically about gay men in the West."

Editions

The popularity of Boys on the Rock is evidenced in the substantial quantity of editions to which it ran, having first been published in 1984 by St. Martin's Press in New York.

A Stonewall Inn paperback edition was published in 1994 by St. Martin Griffin.

References 
 Hoffman, Wayne. "Gay New World." The Washington Post, 11 October 2006: C9.

1984 American novels
American historical novels
American LGBT novels
American political novels
Gay male teen fiction
Novels with gay themes
Novels set in the 1960s
LGBT-related young adult novels
1980s LGBT novels
1984 debut novels